Slip-up Creek is a stream in the U.S. state of South Dakota.

According to tradition, the creek was named when a pioneer farmer's tractor "slipped up" while crossing the stream.

See also
List of rivers of South Dakota

References

Rivers of Minnehaha County, South Dakota
Rivers of South Dakota